is a former Japanese football player.

Playing career
Kawano was born in Miyazaki Prefecture on November 5, 1969. After graduating from Osaka University of Commerce, he joined the Urawa Reds in 1992. In 1992, he moved to the Argentine club Argentino Rosario on loan. In 1993, he returned to the Urawa Reds and played several matches as forward. However he did not play in any matches in 1994 and he moved to the Japan Football League club Vissel Kobe in 1996. The club was promoted to the J1 League in 1997. However he still was not played and he retired at the end of the 1997 season.

Club statistics

References

External links

reds.uijin.com

1969 births
Living people
Osaka University of Commerce alumni
Association football people from Miyazaki Prefecture
Japanese footballers
J1 League players
Japan Football League (1992–1998) players
Argentino de Rosario footballers
Urawa Red Diamonds players
Vissel Kobe players
Association football forwards